Alianne Matamoro Reyes (born 19 January 2000) is a Cuban footballer who plays as a goalkeeper for Costa Rican club Municipal Pococí and the Cuba women's national team.

Club career
Matamoro has played for Pococí in Costa Rica.

International career
Matamoro capped for Cuba at senior level during the 2020 CONCACAF Women's Olympic Qualifying Championship qualification.

References

2000 births
Living people
Cuban women's footballers
Women's association football goalkeepers
Cuba women's international footballers
Cuban expatriate footballers
Cuban expatriate sportspeople in Costa Rica
Expatriate women's footballers in Costa Rica
21st-century Cuban women